The 2017–18 season was Olympique Lyonnais's 68th professional season since its creation in 1950.

Players

Squad information

Out on loan

Transfers

In

Out

Loans out

Pre-season and friendlies

Friendlies

International Champions Cup

Competitions

Overall

Ligue 1

League table

Results summary

Results by round

Matches

Coupe de France

Coupe de la Ligue

UEFA Europa League

Group stage

Knockout phase

Round of 32

Round of 16

Statistics

Appearances and goals

|-
! colspan=14 style=background:#dcdcdc; text-align:center| Goalkeepers

|-
! colspan=14 style=background:#dcdcdc; text-align:center| Defenders

|-
! colspan=14 style=background:#dcdcdc; text-align:center| Midfielders

|-
! colspan=14 style=background:#dcdcdc; text-align:center| Forwards

|-
! colspan=14 style=background:#dcdcdc; text-align:center| Players transferred out during the season

Goalscorers

Kit

In Ligue 1 match at Angers, Lyon wore their away kit from 2015–16 season. Their third kit was released on late November 2017.

References

Lyon
Lyon
Olympique Lyonnais seasons